Missenden Abbey (also referred to as Great Missenden Abbey) is a former Arrouasian (Augustinian) monastery, founded in 1133 in Great Missenden, Buckinghamshire, United Kingdom. The abbey was dissolved in 1538, and the abbey church demolished. In 1574 a house, also known as Missenden Abbey, was constructed on the site of the monastic cloisters, incorporating some of the monastic remains. The house was altered several times, gaining its current "Regency Gothic" style at the beginning of the 19th century. The house was "gutted" by fire in 1985 and subsequently rebuilt.

Abbey

Foundation
The abbey of Missenden was founded c.1133, by William de Missenden, the lord of Missenden manor. Two of the abbey's foundation charters (those issued by King Henry I, and by Alexander, Bishop of Lincoln) state there were originally seven canons, who came to Missenden from "the church of St. Mary 'de Bosco (or de Nemore) de pago Terresino". This church - thought to have been in Ruisseauville, France - was a daughter house of Arrouaise Abbey, also in France. Missenden thus became the home of the first abbey in Buckinghamshire and the second Arrouasian community in England, after Warter Abbey in East Yorkshire.

"The Arrouasian canons differed very little from other Augustinians, and sometimes abandoned at an early date the slight distinctions they originally had". The Arrouasian Order "never seem to have been really an independent order with special privileges", and thus often were not distinguished from canons of the Augustinian Order.

15th and 16th Centuries
During a visit conducted between 1431 and 1436, William Grey, Bishop of Lincoln, found that the abbey did not have enough canons to perform its religious duties, and that some of the abbey's buildings were in need of repair.

A visit in 1518 by William Atwater, Bishop of Lincoln, found the discipline at the abbey was "lax", and that the refectory needed to be repaired. In 1521, a canon at the abbey was forced to do penance for heresy.

In 1530 and 1531 the abbey was visited by John Longland, Bishop of Lincoln, who found the abbey in debt, while all of the buildings were in need of repair. The bishop found the abbot, John Fox, to be " wholly under the influence of a secular, John Compton, who cut down trees and did as he pleased with the goods of the monastery." Bishop Longland suspended Abbot Fox, placing the abbey under the control of John Otwell, who would later become abbot himself.

Dissolution
The abbey was surrendered for dissolution in 1538, and the abbey church was demolished the same year. The last abbot, John Otwell, subsequently married before dying in 1552.

Architectural history and remains
There is no extant plan of the medieval monastery, but a partial reconstruction is possible based on documentary evidence, excavation work and comparisons with other religious houses of the period. The Abbey Church, which was dedicated to the Blessed Virgin Mary, was located on the North side of the cloister, running from west to east, as was typical of the period. Excavated stonework suggests that the church was highly decorated, in a romanesque style. The church housed the largest bell in Buckinghamshire, which weighed more than 2.5 tons.

The abbey church, of which nothing remains, was located 300 yards east of the present building. This building incorporates stonework from the east range of the cloister buildings, but none of it is visible. Excavations conducted in 1983 showed that the abbey church was built in two or three phases; the earliest of which dated from the mid-12th century.

Abbots of Missenden
A list of the known abbots of Missenden:

 Daniel. First abbot; name occurs 1133 and 1145
 Peter, name occurs c.1163
 Adam, name occurs 1198 and 1206
 William, name occurs 1217
 Martin, deposed 1236
 Robert, elected 1236, resigned 1240
 Roger of Gilsburgh, elected 1240
 Simon of London, elected 1258, resigned 1262
 Geoffrey de Welpesle, elected 1262, resigned 1268
 William of London, elected 1268
 Matthew of Tring, died 1306
 Richard Marshall, elected 1306, died 1323
 Robert of Kimble, elected 1323, resigned 1339
 William Delamere, elected 1339, died 1340
 Henry of Buckingham, elected 1340
 John of Abingdon, elected 1347, died 1348
 William of Bradley, elected 1348, resigned 1356
 Ralf Marshall, elected 1356, died 1374
 William of Thenford, elected 1374, died 1384
 John Marsh, elected 1384, died 1398
 Richard Meer, elected 1398
 Robert Risborough, deposed 1462
 Henry Honor of Missenden, elected 1462
 William Smith, (fn. 94) died 1521
 William Honor, elected 1521, died 1528
 John Fox, elected 1528, occurs 1535
 John Otwell, last abbot; abbey dissolved 1538

Burials at the Abbey
John FitzAlan, 2nd Baron Arundel
William Bois
Elizabeth Cellier, Catholic midwife
Joan Howard de Braose
John du Plessis, 7th Earl of Warwick
Lady Isabella Brocas Golafre
Katherine Missenden Iwardby
Sir Edmund Missenden
Sir Thomas Missenden
Elizabeth Hampden Salendine
Lady Juliana Grey Shelley

Country House

Construction
Like many other former monasteries, a country house was constructed on the site of the former abbey. Also known as "Missenden Abbey", the house was constructed in 1574, on the site of the former cloisters, and incorporating some of the monastic remains. The house was altered and remodeled in both the 17th and 18th centuries. Between 1806 and 1814, the house was remodeled in a "Regency Gothic" style, for John Ayton. The two storied house was built around a courtyard and featured "castellated parapets, corner turrets with arrow slits and conical caps."

Fire and later history
The building was designated Grade II listed on 10 March 1983. However, in 1985 the building was destroyed by fire. The house was "gutted". Among that destroyed was the "15th or 16th century roof of the East range", which was "a rare survival of a monastic roof". The building was reconstructed following the fire, with some of the interiors remodeled.

The abbey has been owned by Buckinghamshire New University since the mid-1990s.  It is now used as a conference centre and also used for weddings.

In April 2016, the abbey's first same-sex marriage was performed.

References 
Notes

Bibliography

External links 
 
 The Cartulary of Missenden Abbey online

1133 establishments in England
1538 disestablishments in England
Arrouaisians
Buckinghamshire New University
Christian monasteries established in the 12th century
Country houses in Buckinghamshire
Gothic architecture in England
Grade II listed bridges
Grade II listed houses
Grade II listed parks and gardens in Buckinghamshire
Great Missenden
Monasteries in Buckinghamshire
Religious organizations established in the 1100s